Margaritus of Brindisi (also Margarito; Italian Margaritone or Greek Megareites or Margaritoni [Μαργαριτώνη]: c. 1149 – 1197), called "the new Neptune", was the last great ammiratus ammiratorum (Grand Admiral) of Sicily. Following in the footsteps of Christodulus, George of Antioch, and Maio of Bari, Margaritus led the fleets of the kingdom in the reigns of William II (1166–1189) and Tancred (1189–1194). He probably began as a Greek pirate and gradually rose to the rank of privateer before becoming a permanent admiral of the navy. In 1185, he became the first count palatine of Cephalonia and Zakynthos (or Zante). In 1192, he became the first count of Malta. He also held the titles of Prince of Taranto and Duke of Durazzo.

Biography
Margaritus first appears as a leader of the fleet alongside Tancred, then just count of Lecce, which took Cephalonia and the Ionian Islands in 1185 and then harassed the fleet of Isaac II Angelos at Cyprus and captured many of his ships, taking them back to Sicily. In Autumn 1187, King William sent him with a fleet to the Holy Land, where, on 2 October, Saladin had captured Jerusalem. Margaritus, with 60 ships and 200 knights, patrolled the Palestine coast constantly, preventing Saladin from taking any of the vital seaports of the Latin crusader kingdom. In July 1188, he arrived at Tripoli and forced Saladin to raise the siege of Krak des Chevaliers. Something similar happened at Marqab, Latakia, and Tyre in the following year. On 11 November 1189, William died and his fleet returned. On 4 October 1190, Margaritus, the strategos Jordan du Pin, and many other nobles of Messina were forced to flee when the English king Richard the Lionheart sacked the city and burnt it. Margaritus took little part thereafter in the Third Crusade.

Margaritus was a staunch supporter of Tancred against the king of Germany, Henry VI, who married Constance, aunt of both Tancred and William II. Henry besieged Naples in 1191 and Margaritus came to the city's defence. He harassed Henry's Pisan navy and nearly destroyed the late-arriving Genoese contingent and kept the harbour approaches open. Salerno had surrendered to Henry and invited Constance there, but when Henry was forced to retreat, its population turned against Constance and captured her, and it was Margaritus who delivered her to Messina to Tancred on a typical bireme galley or dromon. Tancred made Margaritus the first count of Malta sometime in 1192, perhaps for this unexpected success, granting him considerable resources.

The war for the kingdom, however, was not given up. Tancred was forced to release Constance the same year; and later Henry sent a second, more powerful navy—mostly Pisan and Genoese—to Naples under the command of Markward von Anweiler. The fleet was augmented by fifty galleys from the Lionheart, forced to promise his support as part of the conditions of his release from a German prison. It landed in the Neapolitan bay on 25 August 1194; Naples surrendered. Next Palermo, where Margaritus defended the citadel, surrendered on November 20. Margaritus and many nobles of the old guard, including Nicholas, Archbishop of Salerno, the son of Matthew of Ajello, and Tancred's widow, Sibylla of Acerra, and brief successor, William III, were present at the Christmas coronation. However, four days later, they were arrested on charges of conspiracy and sent to Germany. He was blinded and died there in 1197, while the Chronicle of Roger of Howden reported that the blind Margaritus was killed in Rome by a servant of his in 1200s by when he, while serving Philip II, King of France, had gone to Brindisi where he had gathered a fleet.

Family

He married Marina, the illegitimate daughter of Roger II of Sicily. Karl Hopf's undocumented conjecture that two daughters of him married respectively Riccardo Orsini, therefore ruler of the county of Cephalonia and Zakynthos, and Leone Vetrano, ruler of Corfu from 1199 until his execution by the Venetians in 1206, has been rejected by modern scholarship.

Sources
Norwich, John Julius. The Kingdom in the Sun 1130-1194. Longman: London, 1970.
The Genoese Annals of Ottobuono Scriba (pdf)
Annales Ianuenses Otoboni Scribae, in Annali Genovesi di Caffaro e de' suoi continuatori, ii (1189-1196). ed L. T. Belgrano and C. Imperiale di Sant'Angelo (Fonti per la storia d'Italia, 1902), pp. 38–41, 45–53.
Garufi, C. A. "Margarito di Brindisi, conte di Malta e ammiraglio del re di Sicilia," in: Miscellanea di archeologia, storia e filologia dedicata al prof. Antonino Salinas, Palermo 1907, 273–282.

References

External links
The story of Margaritus in images.
Domus Margariti.
Genealogy.

1140s births
1197 deaths
12th-century Byzantine people
12th-century Greek people
12th-century Italian people
Medieval admirals
Christians of the Third Crusade
Military history of the Kingdom of Sicily
Counts of Malta
Counts palatine of Cephalonia and Zakynthos
Medieval pirates